Niall Williams may refer to:

 Niall Williams (rugby union) (born 1988), New Zealand sportswoman
 Niall Williams (writer) (born 1958), Irish writer